Bahrāmcha (Pashto/; Balochi ) is the center of Dishu District in the southern part of Helmand Province, Afghanistan.

History 
Bahramcha is a town in Dishu District, Helmand Province, near the border with Pakistan.

Taliban
During the War in Afghanistan (2001–2021), Bahramcha was used by the Taliban to export poppy to Pakistan for processing, becoming an important center of the Helmand opium trade.

References

Populated places in Helmand Province